The Kingdom of Hiran or the Kingdom of Ngoenyang was an early mueang or kingdom of the Northern Thai people from the 7th through 13th centuries AD and was originally centered on Hiran, formerly Vieng Preuksa, in modern-day Thailand near today's Mae Sai District in Chiang Rai, and later on Ngoenyang or Chiang Saen. Ngoenyang was the successor to the mueang of Singhanavati. King Mangrai, the 17th king of Ngoenyang, went on to find Lanna.

In contrast to most contemporary Tai states, Ngoenyang was mentioned in local chronicles, which provide some information about its history.

In 545 AD, an earthquake destroyed the city of Naknakorn and thus the mueang of Singhanavati. Survivors gathered together, and an elective monarchy was established there. The mueang was named Vieng Prueksa, as prueksa means "to counsel".

After 93 years of elective monarchy, Phraya Kalavarnadishraj of the Lavo Kingdom forced the Vieng Prueksa to accept Phraya Lavachakkaraj as their king in 638 AD. Lavachakkaraj renamed the mueang Hiran.

Lavachakka is hypothesized to have been a tribal chief in the area who gained the support of the Lavo Kingdom. The Lavachakkaraj or "Lao dynasty" would go on to rule the area for 700 years.

Lao kiang, the ninth king of Hiran, founded the city of Ngoenyang (modern Chiang Saen) around 850 AD, moved the capital there, and thus became the first King of Ngoenyang. The territorial claims of Ngoenyang extended from Chiang Saen in the west through parts of modern Laos north of Luang Prabang to Thaeng (modern Điện Biên Phủ, Vietnam). Ngoenyang fell under the dominion of the Lu mueang Chiang Hung in the north around 1250 AD and remained within that orbit until the Mongol invasions again shifted power in the area.

The religion of Ngoenyang kingdom was heavily influenced by the Theravada Buddhism of the Hariphunchai kingdom to the south. Around 1250, Lao meng the 16th king of Ngoenyang founded Chiangrai and his son, Mangrai, moved the capital to Chiang Rai when he was crowned as the king of Ngoenyang in 1262. In 1281, Mangrai invaded Hariphunchai and captured the capital (modern Lamphun).

List of Rulers of Hiran Kingdom Age

 1. Phraya Lavachakkaraj
 2. Lao Khao Kaew Mah Mueng
 3. Lao Sao
 4. Lao Tang
 5. Lao Ghrom 
 6. Lao Lheaw
 7. Lao Gab
 8. Lao Kim

List of Rulers of NgeonYang Kingdom Age

Former countries in Thai history
Tai history
638 establishments
1292 disestablishments in Asia
States and territories established in the 630s
7th century in Thailand
8th century in Thailand
9th century in Thailand
10th century in Thailand
11th century in Thailand
12th century in Thailand
13th century in Thailand
Medieval Thailand
Chiang Rai province